Ladder 49 is a 2004 American disaster thriller film directed by Jay Russell and written by Lewis Colick. The film follows Baltimore firefighter Jack Morrison, who is trapped inside a warehouse fire, and his recollection of the events that got him to that point. The film stars Joaquin Phoenix and John Travolta, and was released on October 1, 2004. It received mixed reviews and grossed $102 million worldwide.

Plot
Baltimore City firefighter Jack Morrison saves a man's life in a massive four-alarm fire in a 20-story concrete grain elevator/warehouse in the Canton waterfront neighborhood of Baltimore, Maryland. However, the grain stored in the warehouse explodes, causing Jack to fall through several floors and break his leg. The film follows the efforts of the other men in his unit, Ladder Company 49, led by the commands of Deputy Chief Mike Kennedy, Jack's mentor, to rescue him while Morrison tries to reach a safe area of the burning structure. Interspersed with the current rescue efforts are a series of flashbacks showing how Jack joined the fire department, his first meeting (at a supermarket) with the woman who would eventually become his wife, his relationship with his children, and the bonds he formed and the trials and tribulations he endured with his fellow firefighters.

After graduating from the fire academy, Jack is sent to work on Baltimore City Fire Department (BCFD) Engine Company 33, in the busiest firehouse in the city. Quartered with Engine 33 is Ladder Company 49. On Engine 33, Jack learns the ropes of firefighting. He quickly becomes close friends with his fellow firefighters, including Mike, his Captain at the time. Jack's first fire takes place at a burning vacant rowhouse. Engine 33 and Ladder 49 respond and are the first companies on the scene. Jack and Mike enter the building with a hose line and tackle the blaze, with Jack on the nozzle of the hose. They quickly and triumphantly extinguish it.

After some time working on Engine 33, Jack arrives at the scene of another vacant rowhouse fire, where a fellow firefighter from Ladder 49, Dennis Gauquin dies after falling through the roof of a building. After a quarrel between the firefighters, the Captain tells them to stick together. Later, numerous firefighters attend Dennis's funeral. Jack decides, although it is more dangerous, to take his late friend's position as a "truckie", a search and rescue member on Ladder 49 by transferring to the Truck.

As the years go by, Jack suffers some traumatic experiences, including rescuing a man from the ledge of a burning high-rise building in Downtown Baltimore, and witnessing another friend and fellow firefighter from Ladder 49, Tommy Drake suffer severe burns following a steam explosion at an industrial building. He finds the work rewarding, but his wife initially worries about his safety and opposes the change. However, she eventually accepts his new role and even talks him out of taking an administrative position that Mike, who has now become a Deputy Chief, offers him.

One Christmas Eve, Jack and the members of Engine 33 and Ladder 49 respond to a burning apartment building. Jack is able to rescue a young girl trapped in an engulfed apartment, but is briefly trapped himself before being rescued by a fellow Firefighter from Ladder 49, Leonard "Lenny" Richter. Both men receive the department's Medal of Valor for their actions.

Back at the present day grain building fire that opened the film, Jack's fellow firefighters become extremely determined to rescue him, and Jack does his best to reach the only possible safe area Mike tells him about. However, upon reaching that room he sees that the only exit is cut off by raging flames. Out of air and with the heat intensifying, Jack realizes that his situation is hopeless. He radios Mike to pull his men back so no one else will be killed or hurt while trying to rescue him, and accepts his fate to die in the fire. A devastated Mike reluctantly agrees and commands all rescue units to evacuate the building.

At Jack's funeral, Mike delivers an emotional eulogy in celebration of Jack's life, which inspires a standing ovation from friends and family in attendance. Jack's body is then carried to his resting place, with full honors, on the back of Engine 33 in a typical fireman's funeral procession. The film ends with Mike and the company en route to a call while the former flashes back to Jack and his fellow firefighters going to fires and a final shot of Mike and Jack coming out of Jack's first ever burning building in triumph.

Cast
Joaquin Phoenix as Firefighter Jack Morrison, Ladder Company 49 (formerly Engine Company 33)
John Travolta as Deputy Chief (formerly Captain) Mike Kennedy, Deputy Chief 1 (formerly Engine Company 33)
Jacinda Barrett as Linda Morrison, Jack's wife
Morris Chestnut as Firefighter Tommy Drake, Ladder  Company 49 Tillerman
Balthazar Getty as Firefighter Ray Gauquin, Ladder Company 49
Robert Patrick as Firefighter Leonard "Lenny" Richter, Ladder Company 49
Billy Burke as Firefighter Dennis Gauquin, Ladder Company 49
Tim Guinee as Captain Tony Corrigan, Ladder Company 49
Kevin Chapman as Lieutenant (formerly Firefighter) Frank McKinney, Engine Company 33
Jay Hernandez as Probationary Firefighter Keith Perez, Engine Company 33
Kevin Daniels as Firefighter Engineer Don Miller, Engine Company 33
Steve Maye as Firefighter Pete Lamb, Engine Company 33
Robert Logan Lewis as Firefighter Ed Reilly, Ladder Company 49
Spencer Berglund as Nicky Morrison, Jack and Linda's son
Brooke Hamlin as Katie Morrison, Jack and Linda's daughter
Sam Stockdale as Himself
Paul Novak, Jr. as the Voice of Ladder 49, The Dispatcher - with a deep, sensual baritone
Mayor of Baltimore Martin O'Malley as himself

Songs
Robbie Robertson contributed the film's theme song, "Shine Your Light". He also composed an adagio for the end credits. The film also features "Love Sneakin' Up On You" by Bonnie Raitt, among others.

Reception
Ladder 49 grossed $74,463,263 at the US box office and $102,332,848 worldwide.

Critical response
On review aggregator Rotten Tomatoes, the film has an approval rating of 41% based on 164 reviews, and an average rating of 5.35/10. The site's critical consensus reads, "Instead of humanizing the firemen, the movie idolizes them, and thus renders them into cardboard characters." On Metacritic, the film has a weighted average score of 47 out of 100, based on 32 critics, indicating "mixed or average reviews. Audiences polled by CinemaScore gave the film an average grade of "A−" on an A+ to F scale.

It received a rating of 3.5 out of 4 stars from Roger Ebert, who wrote: "The movie is not about a dying man whose life passes before his eyes, but about a man who saved a life and put himself in danger, and how he got to that place in his life, and what his life and family mean to him. Because it is attentive to these human elements, Ladder 49 draws from the action scenes instead of depending on them."

See also
List of firefighting films
List of films shot in Baltimore
Worcester Cold Storage and Warehouse Co. fire

References

External links

 
 
 
 

2004 films
2000s thriller drama films
American thriller drama films
Films directed by Jay Russell
Films set in Maryland
Films shot in Baltimore
Films about firefighting
Touchstone Pictures films
Beacon Pictures films
Films scored by William Ross
2004 drama films
Saint Patrick's Day films
2000s English-language films
2000s American films